Believe in You is the 7th single by Japanese band Dream, It was the last release to bear the group's three-silhouette logo. The video single (released on DVD and VHS) was released on April 4, 2001. The single reached #36 on the weekly Oricon charts and charted for two weeks. Believe in you was used as an ending theme for the NTV show ZZZ Romihi.

Track list
 Believe in you
 Believe in you (Instrumental)
 My will (sweet dream mix)

DVD/VHS track list
 Believe in you (Promotion Video Clip)
 Believe in you (15sec.TV SPOT)
 Believe in you (30sec.TV SPOT)

Credits
 Lyrics: Mai Matsumuro
 Music: Mitsuru Igarashi
 Others: Kitajima Yasu

External links
 http://www.oricon.co.jp/music/release/d/432961/1/
 http://www.mai-matsumuro.info/dream_official_site_replica/dream/report/believeinyoupv/index.html

2001 singles
Dream (Japanese group) songs
Songs written by Mai Matsumuro
2001 songs
Avex Trax singles